Geon may refer to:

Geon (geology), a time interval
Geon (Korean name), a Korean masculine given name
Geon (physics), a hypothetical gravitational wave packet
Geon (psychology), a geometrical primitive out of which everyday objects can be represented
Geon, short for geonim, rabbis in the medieval era
Geon, a character from the King of the Monsters series of video games
Geon: Emotions, a video game for Xbox 360's Xbox Live Arcade service 
Geon (video game), for PlayStation 3's PlayStation Network and Nintendo Wii